Radovich is a surname. Notable people with the surname include:

Bill Radovich (1915–2002), American football player
Dragan Radovich (born 1956), American soccer player
Drew Radovich (born 1985), American football player
Frank Radovich (born 1938), American basketball player and coach
Moe Radovich (1929–2004), American basketball player and coach

See also
Radović